Priscila Oliveira Heldes (born ) is a Brazilian female volleyball player, playing as a setter. She was part of the Brazil women's national volleyball team.

Clubs
  Mackenzie EC (2007–2012)
  Vôlei Amil/Campinas (2012–2014)
  Brasília Vôlei (2014–2015)
  SESI-São Paulo (2015–2016)
  Fluminense FC (2016–2017)
  SESI-São Paulo (2017–2018)
  Balneário Camboriú (2018–2019)
  Osasco-Audax (2019–2020)
  Minas Tênis Clube (2020–)

Awards

Individuals
 2010 U20 South American Championship – "Best Setter"

References

External links

1992 births
Living people
Brazilian women's volleyball players
Place of birth missing (living people)
Setters (volleyball)
Sportspeople from Belo Horizonte
21st-century Brazilian women